This is a list of films which placed number one at the weekly box office in Turkey during 2017. The weeks start on Fridays, and finish on Thursdays. The box-office number one is established in terms of tickets sold during the week.

Box office number-one films

Highest-grossing films

In-Year Release

References

2017
Turkey
2017 in Turkish cinema